A straitjacket is a garment used for restraint.

Straitjacket may also refer to:
 Straitjacket (comedy duo), a comedy team from England
Strait Jacket, a novel series by Ichirō Sakaki

Film
 Strait-Jacket, a 1964 Columbia Pictures film starring Joan Crawford
 Straight-Jacket, a 2004 gay-themed romantic comedy film
 Strait Jacket, a 2007 Japanese video series based on the novel series, produced by Feel

Music
 Los Straitjackets, an American instrumental band
 The Straightjackets, band led by Delbert McClinton
 Straitjacket Fits, a New Zealand rock band active from 1986-1994
 "Straight Jacket", a 2018 single by Canadian rock band Theory of a Deadman

Other
 Straight jacket, a pro wrestling hold